Marco Bezzecchi (born 12 November 1998) is an Italian Grand Prix motorcycle racer, competing for Mooney VR46 Racing Team in the 2023 MotoGP World Championship.

Career

Junior career
Bezzecchi won the Italian Moto3 championship in 2015, and also made his debut in the 2015 FIM CEV Moto3 Junior World Championship that season. He ended the year 16th in the standings, with 29 points, finishing in the top-10 on three occasions. The 2016 FIM CEV Moto3 Junior World Championship was very similar for him, finishing in the top-10 three times, this time scoring 31 points, enough for 18th in the standings.

Moto3 World Championship
Bezzecchi made his debut in the 2015 Moto3 World Championship, with two wild-card appearances, finishing 26th in Qatar, and retiring in his home Grand Prix of Italy.

Mahindra Racing (2016)
In the 2016 season, he again competed in two races, retiring in Austria and finishing 24th in Great Britain.

CIP (2017)
Bezzecchi competed full time in the 2017 Moto3 World Championship, riding for Mahindra CIP, teammate of Manuel Pagliani. Bezzecchi had a slow rookie season, up until the race in Japan; he finished in 14th once, and 15th twice for a total of four points, but in the Motegi race he managed a 3rd place, his maiden podium in Moto3. He ended the season with 20 points, 23rd in the standings, second among rookies.

Redox PrüstelGP (2018)
For the 2018 season, Bezzecchi would switch teams and ride for Prüstel GP. He won three races (Argentina, Austria, and Japan), finished 2nd five times, once in 3rd, and had two pole positions, ending the season with nine podiums, 214 points, and 3rd in the overall championship standings.

Moto2 World Championship

Red Bull KTM Tech3 (2019)
Partnering Philipp Öttl at Red Bull KTM Tech3 for the 2019 Moto2 World Championship, Bezzecchi had a bad rookie year, finishing in the points only four times, ending his season with 17 points, and 23rd in the final standings.

Sky Racing Team VR46 (2020–2021)
For the 2020 Moto2 World Championship, Bezzecchi joined the newly formed Sky Racing Team VR46, alongside Luca Marini. The duo would have a very good season, winning the teams' championship by 113 points with five race wins between them (Marini three, Bezzecchi two). Bezzecchi won the races in Austria and Valencia, finished 2nd in Misano and Rimini, and finished 3rd in a further three races, ending his season with seven podiums, 184 points, and 4th in the championship standings.

Following Luca Marini moving up to MotoGP, Bezzecchi's teammate for the 2021 season was Celestino Vietti. Bezzecchi had a very well balanced season, rarely finishing outside the top five, winning a race in Austria, finishing 2nd in Jerez and Silverstone, and 3rd in Le Mans, Mugello, Germany, and Austin. He finished the year 3rd in the rider's championship, with 214 points.

MotoGP World Championship

Mooney VR46 Racing Team (2022–present)
For the 2022 season, Bezzecchi was confirmed to be moving up to the premier class, partnering his 2020 teammate at Mooney VR46 Racing Team, Luca Marini. He picked up his first podium finish in MotoGP at the Dutch TT. Later in the season, he got his first MotoGP pole position at the Thailand Grand Prix.

Bezzecchi is due to stay with the same team for the 2023 season.

Career statistics

Grand Prix motorcycle racing

By season

By class

Races by year
(key) (Races in bold indicate pole position, races in italics indicate fastest lap)

References

External links

 
Profile on teamitaliafmi.com
 

1998 births
Living people
Italian motorcycle racers
Moto3 World Championship riders
Sportspeople from Rimini
Moto2 World Championship riders
MotoGP World Championship riders
VR46 Racing Team MotoGP riders
21st-century Italian people